Scott Miller is an American LGBT rights activist, philanthropist and former banker. He has served as the U.S. ambassador to Switzerland and Liechtenstein since 2022.

Education 
Miller graduated from the University of Colorado Boulder with a Bachelor of Science in Business Administration.

Career 
Miller worked as a management consultant at Accenture, as an event planner and as an account vice president at UBS Wealth Management in Denver.

Activism and philanthropy 
Together with his husband, Tim Gill, Miller is active in LGBT rights activism, philanthropy, and Democratic Party politics.

Both are co-chairs of the Gill Foundation, one of the largest sponsors of LGBT equality causes in the United States. The foundation was instrumental in improving the reputation and visibility of LGBT people in Colorado and changing its image as a "hate state".

Gill and Miller are political allies of Colorado Governor Jared Polis, and Gill has been described as "one of the architects of the Democratic takeover of Colorado politics". Gill and Miller have donated at least $3.6 million to Democratic candidates and campaigns since 2010, and Miller has been active in groups supporting the presidential candidacies of Hillary Clinton and Joe Biden.

Ambassador to Switzerland 
On August 6, 2021, President Joe Biden announced his intent to nominate Miller to be the U.S. Ambassador to Switzerland and Liechtenstein. The post is traditionally given to a political appointee, often a prominent donor.

On August 10, 2021, his nomination was sent to the Senate. Hearings on his nomination were held before the Senate Foreign Relations Committee on November 2, 2021. The committee reported him favorably on December 15, 2021. On December 18, 2021, the United States Senate confirmed his nomination by voice vote. He was sworn in on December 21, 2021. He presented his letters of credence to the President of the Swiss Confederation, Ignazio Cassis, on January 11, 2022. On February 16, 2022, he presented his credentials to Alois, Hereditary Prince of Liechtenstein at Vaduz Castle.

Personal life 
Miller married Tim Gill, the founder of Quark, in 2009, in a ceremony officiated by Governor Deval Patrick. The couple lives in Phipps Mansion in Denver.

References 

Living people
Year of birth missing (living people)
Ambassadors of the United States to Liechtenstein
Ambassadors of the United States to Switzerland
American bankers
Gay diplomats
LGBT ambassadors of the United States
American LGBT rights activists
Philanthropists from Colorado